Tom Cringle may refer to:

 Tom Cringle, pseudonym of Michael Scott (novelist) (1789–1835), British author
 Tom Cringle, nom-de-plume of William Walker (1838–1908), Scottish-born Australian writer